Gerry McGrath (born June 14, 1959) is a former Canadian football placekicker and punter and former head coach for Concordia University's football team, the Concordia Stingers. McGrath became Concordia's head coach in 2000 after serving for eight years as the team's offensive coordinator. As a professional player, he played for six seasons for the Montreal Alouettes, Montreal Concordes, and Saskatchewan Roughriders of the Canadian Football League. He played junior football for the Verdun Maple Leafs of the Canadian Junior Football League.

References

External links
Concordia Stingers profile

1959 births
Anglophone Quebec people
Canadian football placekickers
Canadian football punters
Concordia Stingers football coaches
Living people
Montreal Alouettes players
Ottawa Rough Riders players
Players of Canadian football from Quebec
Canadian football people from Montreal
Saskatchewan Roughriders players